30th Corps, Thirtieth Corps, or XXX Corps may refer to:

XXX Corps (United Kingdom)
XXX Army Corps (Wehrmacht)
XXX Corps (Pakistan)

See also
List of military corps by number
 30th Army (disambiguation)
 30th Battalion (disambiguation)
 30th Division (disambiguation)
 30th Regiment (disambiguation)
 30 Squadron (disambiguation)